Thomas Murdoch CMG (15 March 1868 – 29 June 1946) was an Australian politician in Tasmania.

Murdoch was born in Hobart.

In 1914 he was elected to the Tasmanian Legislative Council as an independent member for Hobart. Defeated in 1916, he was re-elected in 1921 and held the seat until 1927, when he transferred to the seat of Buckingham. He was appointed Chair of Committees in 1932 and elected President of the Council in 1937.  For this service he was appointed a Companion of the Order of St Michael and St George (CMG).

In 1928, Murdoch moved unsuccessfully in the Legislative Council that Tasmania should secede from the rest of Australia.

He was defeated in 1944 and died in Hobart in 1946.

References

External links
 Elizabeth Jones, 'Murdoch, Thomas (1868–1946)', Australian Dictionary of Biography, National Centre of Biography, Australian National University, accessed 4 February 2014.

1868 births
1946 deaths
Independent members of the Parliament of Tasmania
Members of the Tasmanian Legislative Council
Presidents of the Tasmanian Legislative Council
Politicians from Hobart
20th-century Australian politicians